Omar Nicolás Govea García (born 18 January 1996) is a Mexican professional footballer who plays as a midfielder for Liga MX club Monterrey, on loan from Liga I club FC Voluntari.

After starting out in his native Mexico, he went on to compete professionally in Portugal, Belgium and Romania.

Internationally, Govea earned his first cap with the senior team in a 1–0 friendly victory over Poland in November 2017.

Club career

América
Govea spent two years at San Luis where he played in two under-15 tournaments. He was part of a Tercera División selection team where he met Jesús Ramírez, the coach of América's youth academy. He participated at América's under-17 and under-20 youth teams.

Loans to Zacatecas and Porto B
In the summer of 2014, it was announced Govea was sent out on loan to Ascenso MX club Zacatecas in order to gain professional playing experience. He made his professional debut as substitute on 5 August 2014 in a Copa MX match against Leones Negros, coming on for Antonio López at 82'.

In July 2015, Govea joined FC Porto on loan, and was immediately sent to play for their B team.

He was called to Porto's senior team for the first time on 19 January 2016, in order to make the squad to play against Famalicão in a Taça da Liga match the next day.

Porto
In May 2016, it was reported that Porto had signed Govea on a permanent transfer, with the player signing a four-year contract with the club.

Loans to Mouscron and Royal Antwerp
On 6 July 2017, Govea joined Belgian club Royal Excel Mouscron on a one-year loan with an option of purchase. He made his Belgian First Division A debut on 13 July in a 1–0 win over KV Oostende.

On 16 August 2018, Govea joined Royal Antwerp FC on a one-year loan with an option of purchase, where he will wear the number 23.

Zulte Waregem
On 9 July 2019, Belgian club Zulte Waregem announced Govea as a new signing. He signed a three-year contract with an option of another year. He made his debut on 27 July in a 2–0 loss against Mechelen. On 14 December, he scored his first two goals in a 5–1 home win against Sint-Truiden.

In January 2020, he was named as the club's Player of the month for December due to his performances.

Voluntari
On 21 September 2022, Govea agreed to a two-year contract with Romanian club Voluntari.

Loan to Monterrey
On 17 December 2022, Monterrey announced the signing of Govea on a one-year loan with an option to buy.

International career
On 13 November 2017, Govea made his senior debut for Mexico in a 1–0 friendly win over Poland.

Career statistics

Club

International

Honours
Porto B
Segunda Liga: 2015–16
Premier League International Cup: 2016–17

Mexico U17
FIFA U-17 World Cup runner-up: 2013

Individual
Zulte Waregem Player of the Month: December 2019

References

1996 births
Living people
Footballers from San Luis Potosí
Mexican footballers
Association football midfielders
Ascenso MX players
Club América footballers
Mineros de Zacatecas players
Liga Portugal 2 players
FC Porto B players
Royal Excel Mouscron players
Belgian Pro League players
Royal Antwerp F.C. players
S.V. Zulte Waregem players
Liga I players
FC Voluntari players
Liga MX players
C.F. Monterrey players
Mexico youth international footballers
Mexico international footballers
Mexican expatriate footballers
Expatriate footballers in Portugal
Expatriate footballers in Belgium
Expatriate footballers in Romania
Mexican expatriate sportspeople in Portugal
Mexican expatriate sportspeople in Belgium
Mexican expatriate sportspeople in Romania